State Route 298 (SR 298), also known as Genesis Road, is a north–south state highway in the Cumberland Plateau region of East Tennessee.

Route description

SR 298 begins in Cumberland County in Crossville at an intersection with US 127/SR 28 just north of downtown. It goes northeast as a two-lane highway through neighborhoods before widening to a four-lane undivided highway and passing through industrial areas, where it crosses over the Little Obed River. SR 298 then has an interchange with I-40 (exit 320) before leaving Crossville and narrowing to two lanes. The highway then winds it way northeast through farmland before crossing the Obed River and entering the Catoosa Wildlife Management Area. SR 298 passes through the wooded areas of the management area as it crosses into Morgan County. The highway then passes through rural areas and farmland as it leaves the Catoosa Wildlife Management Area. SR 298 continues east to cross a bridge over Clear Creek shortly before coming to an end at an intersection with SR 62 west of Lancing.

Major intersections

References

298
Transportation in Cumberland County, Tennessee
Transportation in Morgan County, Tennessee